Premwadee Doungsin (born 16 December 1993) is a Thai woman cricketer. She made her international debut at the 2013 ICC Women's World Twenty20 Qualifier and was also the part of the national team at the 2015 ICC Women's World Twenty20 Qualifier.

Premwadee also competed at the 2014 Asian Games representing Thailand.

References

External links 
 
Profile at CricHQ

1993 births
Living people
Premwadee Doungsin
Cricketers at the 2014 Asian Games
Premwadee Doungsin
Premwadee Doungsin